Pirjo Seppä (born February 8, 1946 in Virolahti) is a Finnish orienteering competitor and World Champion. She participated on the Finnish winning team in the 1972 World Orienteering Championships, and also won a silver medal in the individual contest.

Seppä was member of the team that won bronze medals in the relay in the 1968 World Orienteering Championships. She competed in the 1970 World Orienteering Championships, where she placed fourth in the individual contest.

See also
 Finnish orienteers
 List of orienteers
 List of orienteering events

References

1946 births
Living people
People from Virolahti
Finnish orienteers
Female orienteers
Foot orienteers
World Orienteering Championships medalists
Sportspeople from Kymenlaakso